Rice cereal is the name commonly given to industrially manufactured baby food based on rice. It is also commonly used in Rice Krispy treats. Its ingredient list is not well defined and depends on the manufacturer. It has been recommended by pediatricians in the United States as the initial food for solid food-ready babies for the second half of the 20th century.

See also

 Rice
 List of porridges

References 

Infant feeding
Rice dishes
Porridges